Divyang Hinganekar (born 14 October 1993) is an Indian cricketer. He made his List A debut for Maharashtra in the 2017–18 Vijay Hazare Trophy on 15 February 2018. He made his first-class debut on 17 February 2022, for Maharashtra in the 2021–22 Ranji Trophy.

References

External links
 

1993 births
Living people
Indian cricketers
Maharashtra cricketers
Place of birth missing (living people)